Global Reports on Adult Learning and Education (GRALE) are a series of reports that monitor progress on Adult Learning and Education (ALE), promote action, identify trends in the field of ALE, and explore solutions to challenges.

GRALE play a key role in meeting UNESCO's commitment to monitor and report on countries' implementation of the Belém Framework for Action. This framework was adopted by 144 UNESCO Member States at the Sixth International Conference on Adult Learning and Education (CONFINTEA VI), which was held in Belém, Brazil in 2009. In the Belém Framework for Action, countries agreed to improve ALE across five areas of action: policy, governance, financing, participation, inclusion and equity, and quality.

Overview 
Since it was founded in 1945, UNESCO has been supporting global dialogue and action in the field of Adult Learning and Education.

In 1949, it organized the first CONFINTEA. Since then, five further CONFINTEA conferences have taken place at intervals of roughly twelve years, providing UNESCO member states with valuable opportunities to consider, compare and develop their approaches to ALE. The GRALE series lies at the heart of global monitoring of ALE.

Each report gathers the latest data and evidence on ALE, highlights good policies and practices, and reminds governments of their ALE-related commitments. As part of the process of gathering data for GRALE, UNESCO invites countries to submit detailed national reports on ALE.

Thus, GRALE encourages countries to undertake a self-assessment exercise and to consider their progress in each of the five action areas identified in the Belém Framework for Action. Following the publication of each GRALE, its findings are presented at a wide range of events and discussed with a broad range of partners. GRALE therefore engages countries in dialogue and encourages them to learn from each other on how to improve ALE policies and practices.

Reports 
GRALE 1 was designed to inform discussions at CONFINTEA VI in 2009. In order to prepare GRALE 1, countries were invited to submit national reports, which were largely in narrative form. Based on these reports, GRALE I provided a general overview of trends and identified key challenges in ALE. The report found that while many countries had implemented adult education policies, governments were not allocating sufficient funds for the sector to deliver its full potential.

GRALE 2 presented the first opportunity to take stock of the implementation of the Belém Framework for Action. Member states were invited to complete a monitoring survey that was more structured than the narrative reports that had been submitted for GRALE 1. GRALE 2 also focused on a specific theme: youth and adult literacy, which the Belém Framework for Action identifies as the foundation of lifelong learning. GRALE 2 helped clarify concepts of literacy, providing guidance and inspiration for the later drafting of the Recommendation on Adult Learning and Education (2015).

GRALE 3 reflects the move towards a more holistic view of education and lifelong learning embedded in the 2030 Agenda for Sustainable Development. This holistic view is the rationale behind the chapters on health and well-being, employment and the labour market, and social, civic and community life.

GRALE 4 monitors the extent to which UNESCO Member States put their international commitments regarding ALE into practice and reflects data submitted by 159 countries. It calls for a major change in the approach to ALE, backed by adequate investment to ensure that everyone has the opportunity to access and benefit from ALE and that its contribution to the 2030 Agenda for Sustainable Development is fully realized.

GRALE 5 is currently in the making. It will combine survey data, policy analysis and case studies to provide policy-makers, researchers and practitioners an up-to-date picture of the status of ALE in UNESCO Member States, together with a review of citizenship education, including global citizenship education. It will provide recommendations for strengthening developments in ALE and for promoting active and global citizenship. GRALE 5 will be launched at the seventh International Conference on Adult Education (CONFINTEA VII) in Morocco in 2022.

Sources

References 

Free content from UNESCO
Adult education
UNESCO
Education International